Abdul Rahman Sulaeman (born 14 May 1988) is an Indonesian professional footballer who plays as a center-back for Liga 1 club PSM Makassar. He started his international career in Indonesia U23. He made his debut for senior national team in the 2014 FIFA World Cup qualification against Bahrain on 29 February 2012, of which ended in 10–0 demolition for Indonesia, their worst ever defeat.

Club career 
He signed a contract with Persib Bandung on 23 November 2013. On 16 January 2016, he signed a contract with Karketu Dili.

International career 
He made his debut for Indonesia in 2014 FIFA World Cup qualification against Bahrain on 29 February 2012.

Career statistics

International

International goals
Abdul Rahman: International under-23 goals

Honours

Club 
Semen Padang
 Indonesia Premier League: 2011-12

Persib Bandung
 Indonesia Super League: 2014
 Indonesia President's Cup: 2015

PSM Makassar
 Piala Indonesia: 2019

International
Indonesia U-23
Southeast Asian Games  Silver medal: 2011

References

External links 
 

1988 births
Living people
Bugis people
Sportspeople from Makassar
Indonesian footballers
Indonesia youth international footballers
Indonesia international footballers
Pelita Jaya FC players
Persita Tangerang players
Sriwijaya F.C. players
Semen Padang F.C. players
Persib Bandung players
PSM Makassar players
Indonesian Super League-winning players
Liga 1 (Indonesia) players
Indonesian expatriate sportspeople in East Timor
Expatriate footballers in East Timor
Indonesian expatriate footballers
Association football central defenders
Bali United F.C. players
Southeast Asian Games silver medalists for Indonesia
Southeast Asian Games medalists in football
Competitors at the 2011 Southeast Asian Games